Puerto Lindo o Garrote is a corregimiento in Portobelo District, Colón Province, Panama with a population of 869 as of 2010. Its population as of 1990 was 591; its population as of 2000 was 721.

References

Corregimientos of Colón Province